The Burning Halo is the third album released by the band Draconian through Napalm Records on the 29th of September 2006 (10 October 2006 in the United States). It consists of three original songs (tracks 1-3), three redone demos from The Closed Eyes of Paradise (tracks 4-6), and two covers of songs from the 1970s (tracks 7 & 8).

Track listing

Personnel 
 Lisa Johansson - vocals
 Anders Jacobsson - vocals
 Johan Ericson - lead and rhythm guitars, producer
 Daniel Arvidsson - guitars
 Andreas Karlsson - keyboards, programming, producer
 Fredrik Johansson - bass
 Jerry Torstensson - drums, percussion

Additional personnel
Zdrite Romeo - photography
Fredrik Karlsson - photography
Theres Björk - photography
Peter in de Betou - mastering
Travis Smith - artwork
Anders Bergström - mixing

References 

 "The Burning Halo" at discogs.com link

Draconian (band) albums
2006 compilation albums
Napalm Records albums